Igbo Eze South (or Igboeze South) is a Local Government Area of Enugu State in South East, Nigeria. Its headquarters are in the town of Ibagwa-Aka (or Ibagwa-Eka). The present local government Chairman is Comrade Peter Andy.
 
It has an area of 158 km and a population of 147,328 at the 2006 census.  Ten towns make up Igbo-eze south Local.  These are Alor-Agu, Unadu, Itchi, Nkalagu-Obukpa, Ibagwa Aka, Iheakpu -Awka, Uhunowerre, Ovoko-Ulo, Ovoko-Agu, and Iheaka.  Agriculture and trade are the mains economic activities.  Agro produce like Yams, Palm oil, Cassava, Bambara Nuts, Palm Kernel, Cowpea, and Livestock are produced and traded at the markets.

There are major Markets in Igbo-eze south, these include Orie Igbo-eze, Nkwo Ibagwa, Afor Unadu, Eke itchi.  These markets mostly operate on a rotational basis representing the Four market days of traditional Igbo Calendar- Eke, Orie, Afor, Nkwo.

Climate

The rainy season begins in March/April and lasts until October/November[8] with annual rainfall varying from 1,400mm to 2,000mm

An average annual temperature above 20 °C (68.0 °F) creates an annual relative humidity of 75%. With humidity reaching 90% in the rainy season. The dry season experiences two months of Harmattan from late December to late February. The hottest months are between January and March.

The postal code of the area is 413.

Language 
All communities in Igbo-eze South speak the same Nsukka Dialect of the Igbo Language.

References

Local Government Areas in Enugu State
Local Government Areas in Igboland